The WELS Synodical Council is the governing body of the Wisconsin Evangelical Lutheran Synod when the synod is not in convention.  The Council is made up of twenty-three WELS members including eleven clergy and thirteen laymen.  These men "act as a corporate board to plan and direct WELS worldwide ministry."

Although the Synodical Council does have governing authority, its decisions may be rejected by the biennial Synod in Convention, where a larger group of WELS members have a chance to vote.  One of the most recent decisions to be rejected was the Synodical Council's recommendation to close Michigan Lutheran Seminary as a preparatory school.

References

Lutheranism in Wisconsin
Christianity in Milwaukee
Wisconsin Evangelical Lutheran Synod